The European Award For Congolese Literature, known as the Prix Makomi, is an annual literary prize awarded by the European Union National Institutes for Culture. The prize ceremony is held annually at the Fête du Livre de Kinshasa, which takes place November 12-16. The prize is awarded annually in three categories: Best Short story, Best Novel, and Best Poem. Additional prizes include the honorary diploma and special mentions.

History 
The prize was started by EUNIC in order to promote publishing of books in the DRC. The prize is now supported by the European Union delegation through the many European cultural institutions in the DRC, including the Centre Wallonie-Bruxelles, Goethe-Institut, Institut français, Académie des Beaux-Arts and Instituto Camões.

Laureates

References

 
 

African literary awards
Poetry awards
Short story awards
Fiction awards
Cultural policies of the European Union